Hadesina goeleti is a moth of the family Notodontidae first described by James S. Miller in 2008. It is found in north-western Costa Rica, near the Nicaraguan border.

The length of the forewings is 14–15.5 mm for males and 15.5–16 mm for females. The ground color of the forewings is dark chocolate brown. The hindwings are dark chocolate brown, with a yellow-orange central area.

Etymology
The species is named in honor of Robert G. Goelet, chairman emeritus and current trustee of the American Museum of Natural History.

References

Moths described in 2008
Notodontidae